= Tyrannophobia =

Tyrannophobia, defined as the fear of dictatorship, is a prevalent theme in American political discourse. Despite its prominence, the United States has never experienced a dictatorship, raising questions about the origins and implications of this pervasive fear.

== Background ==
In their 2009 paper "Tyrannophobia," legal scholars Eric A. Posner and Adrian Vermeule examine this phenomenon, suggesting that tyrannophobia is an irrational political attitude that has interfered with, and continues to interfere with, needed institutional reform.

The concept of tyrannophobia has also been explored in various media. For instance, the BackStory radio program delved into the historical and contemporary aspects of this fear, discussing how perceptions of authoritarianism in the United States have evolved over time.

== Discussion ==
A lot of discussions around tyrannophobia have highlighted its potential to divert attention from underlying social and economic issues, focusing instead on perceived threats to democratic institutions. This perspective suggests that addressing the root causes of political dissatisfaction may be more effective than solely fixating on the fear of potential dictatorship.

Tyrannophobia represents a complex interplay of historical experiences, cultural narratives, and political dynamics. While it has contributed to a vigilant political culture, it's essential to critically assess its impact on policy and societal progress.
